Cheiracanthium punctorium, one of several species commonly known as the yellow sac spider, is a spider found from central Europe to Central Asia. They reach a length of about 15 mm, and their bite can penetrate human skin; the bite has been compared to a wasp sting, perhaps a bit more severe, although susceptible persons can have stronger reactions, like nausea. Females build an egg sac of about 4 cm in high grass. It opens below and is aggressively defended.

In Germany, where it is the only "seriously" venomous spider, it is a rare species, only known to occur in notable numbers in the Kaiserstuhl region, the hottest part of the country. Due to changing weather patterns, leading to increased aridity and less precipitation in some areas, this species spreads to more northern parts of Europe, e.g. Brandenburg, Germany, where the present trend is towards a climate more similar to the Central Asian steppes where C. punctorium is most numerous.

The genus Cheiracanthium was transferred from the Clubionidae to the Miturgidae, and then to the Cheiracanthiidae.

Footnotes

References
  (2007): The world spider catalog, version 8.0. American Museum of Natural History.

External links 

 

punctorium
Spiders of Asia
Spiders of Europe
Spiders described in 1789